Hayley Arceneaux (born December 4, 1991) is a St. Jude Children's Research Hospital physician assistant and commercial astronaut. She joined billionaire Jared Isaacman on SpaceX's first private spaceflight Inspiration4, which launched on September 16, 2021, 00:02:56 UTC, and successfully water-landed local-time on Saturday, September 18. Arceneaux became the first human in space with a prosthetic leg bone after surviving bone cancer. At age 29, Arceneaux was the youngest American to travel to space, surpassed a few months later by 23 year old Cameron Bess aboard Blue Origin NS-19. Arceneaux remains the youngest American who has been in orbit.

Early life and education 
Arceneaux was raised in St. Francisville, Louisiana. 
Her father, Howard Stanford Arceneaux, died July 5, 2018, at the age of 60 years old. Her brother, Hayden, and sister-in-law, Liz Suttles, are aerospace engineers.

When she was 10 years old, her left knee began to ache. Her doctor thought it was just a sprain, but a few months later, tests revealed she had osteosarcoma, a type of bone cancer. Her family turned to St. Jude Children's Research Hospital for her treatment and care, which included around a dozen rounds of chemotherapy, a limb-preservation surgery with knee replacement and placement of a titanium rod in her left thigh bone along with associated physical therapy. The experience inspired her to want to work with other cancer patients at St. Jude, which she does as a physician assistant working with leukemia and lymphoma patients.

Arceneaux graduated from St. Joseph's Academy in Baton Rouge, Louisiana, and obtained an undergraduate degree in Spanish in 2014. She obtained her Physician Assistant (PA) degree in 2016 from LSU Health in Shreveport, Louisiana.

Personal endeavors

Inspiration4 spaceflight
Arceneaux was described as the chief medical officer onboard Inspiration4, a private spaceflight funded by billionaire Jared Isaacman. She has said she thinks she will be the first Cajun in space. She is the first person to launch with a prosthesis. As part of the training, she climbed Mount Rainier in Washington with the rest of the Inspiration4 crew.

Arceneaux received the call sign "Nova" during training.

Arceneaux is featured on the cover of a Time magazine double issue with the crew of Inspiration4 in August 2021.

She is a member of the Association of Space Explorers.

Awards
2003 Louisiana Young Heroes.

Bibliography
Wild Ride: A Memoir of I.V. Drips and Rocket Ships - by  Hayley Arceneaux - 2022 -

References

External links

 SpaceFacts.de: Hayley Arceneaux : Tourist Biography

1991 births
Living people
People from Baton Rouge, Louisiana
People from Memphis, Tennessee
Space tourists
Cajun people
Inspiration4